The Bury Bar Frame locomotive was an early type of steam locomotive, developed at the Liverpool works of Edward Bury and Company, later named Bury, Curtis, and Kennedy in 1842. By the 1830s, the railway locomotive had evolved into three basic types - those developed by Robert Stephenson, Timothy Hackworth and Edward Bury.

History
Edward Bury set himself up as an iron founder in Liverpool in the 1820s and manufactured various metal goods including marine steam engines as well as railway locomotives. The basis of the Bury Bar Frame locomotive type emerged in 1830 as Bury's second locomotive  Liverpool, and while it had some issues it also had advantages compared to contemporary Stephenson locomotives. It is understood that most of the engineering was done by Bury's partner Kennedy, with Bury focusing more on the business side.

Bury was unable to make inroads into George Stephenson's supply of locomotives to the Liverpool and Manchester Railway, managing to supply only one, No. 28 Liver.  On other railways the Bury Bar Frame become noted for workmanship, economy, and reliability with Bury becoming Stephenson's major competitor.  In the 1830s Bury exported 28 engines to the United States, only slightly less than Stephenson's 35.

The London and Birmingham Railway (L&BR) directors wished to avoid giving a monopoly on locomotive supply to the Stephensons, and this actually resulted in Bury being appointed as locomotive superintendent and supplier to the L&BR railway with 110 of 180 being supplied by Bury, the remaining 70 by other contractors, though all were of the Bury Bar Type.

These included the Eastern Counties Railway, Manchester, Bolton and Bury Railway, Midland Counties Railway, Lancaster and Preston Junction Railway, and North Union Railway.

In England, distances were shorter and traffic density was rising, so the trackwork was gradually improving. During the 1840s Stephenson had increased the power in his long boiler locomotive, while in 1847 David Joy introduced the Jenny Lind design.

Overseas

United States
The  locomotive Liverpool, which did not prosper in England, was heavily rebuilt and sold to the Petersburg Railroad in 1832.  The rebuild, which converted the locomotive to  gauge with  cylinders and smaller  wheels, began operation on the Petersburg Railroad on 13 April 1833, and proved sufficiently successful to result in further orders from Bury.

Bury Bar Frame four wheelers proved more suited to the lightweight track and wood fuel used in America.  The use of the bar-frame and D-plan dome topped firebox became the classic American design of the nineteenth century,  being adopted by the major manufacturers Baldwin, Norris, and Rogers.

France
Four locomotives were supplied to the Chemin de Fer de Paris à St. Germaine which opened in 1837.

Ireland
Twenty locomotives for the Great Southern and Western Railway of Ireland, one of which, No. 36, is preserved, were the last to use the cylindrical firebox.

Characteristics
Notable features were: forged-iron bar frames; spherical topped outer firebox with internal copper firebox of semi-circular section; near horizontal inside cylinders driving cranked axles.

Frames
A major problem was the effect of their weight on the track of the time.  Engines were increasing in size as more power was needed. Robert Stephenson had developed the Patentee with an extra pair of wheels to distribute the weight. However, this brought problems in that the extra length affected road-holding on curves. Such locomotives used a heavy, rigid frame of timber sandwiched between iron plates outside the wheels, plus internal iron sub-frames. Bury adopted a different approach by keeping to two axles and fabricating a bar frame inside the wheels, consisting (on each side) of two wrought-iron bars, a rectangular-section bar above the axle bearings and a round-section bar below.

From 1845 Bury built much bigger six-wheeled locomotives with bar frames; one of these, a 2-2-2 of 1847, was preserved and may be seen in Cork railway station.

Boilers
Bury engines were also notable for their round topped "haystack" fireboxes from 1830 until mid-1847; thereafter Bury, Curtis & Kennedy's engines were fitted with a raised but straight-topped firebox.  The boiler pressure was gradually increased from 50 psi in the 1830s to a maximum of 85 psi by about 1850.

Advantages and disadvantages
While Bury's four-wheeled engines were criticised for their alleged lack of strength and power they were in practice fast, reliable, low maintenance, and performed well on the typical 50-ton trains of the 1830s.  In general they were superior to the type Stephenson six-wheelers of the same period that despite appearances had smaller boilers, poor weight distribution, and less longevity. The design was emulated by a number of manufacturers, and they lasted on the London & North Western Railway until the 1860s, and on other lines until much later. The main problem with them (and with other inside-cylinder engines) was the breakage of the crank axle but this was a rare occurrence with Bury's engines.

References

Footnotes

Sources

Further reading
 

London and Birmingham Railway
London and North Western Railway locomotives
Steam locomotive types
Steam locomotive technologies